The Department of Urban Development (IAST: Nagara Vikāsa Vibhāga), often abbreviated as DoUD, is a department of Government of Uttar Pradesh responsible for formulation and administration of the rules and regulations and laws relating to the local bodies (town areas, municipal councils and municipal corporations) and urban development in Uttar Pradesh.

Retired IAS Arvind Kumar Sharma serves as the departmental cabinet minister, and the Principal Secretary (Urban Development), an IAS officer, is the administrative head of the department.

Functions 
The department is responsible for making and implementing laws and policies relating to Urban Development. The Department of Urban Development, through the Directorate of Local Bodies, is also responsible for proper functioning of local bodies, especially the Municipal Corporations, by providing financial assistance and other type of grants to local bodies. In addition the department is also responsible for providing cities with proper sanitation, infrastructure and other civic amenities.

Statutory, Autonomous and Attached bodies
 Uttar Pradesh Jal Nigam
 State Urban Development Agency (SUDA)
 Uttar Pradesh State Ganga River Conservation Authority
 Uttar Pradesh Urban Transport Directorate
 Directorate of Local Bodies
Local bodies-
1. 17 Municipal Corporations
2. 200 Municipal Councils
3. 537 Town Areas

Important officials 
Ashutosh Tandon, is the Cabinet Minister responsible for Department of Urban Development while Girish Kumar Yadav is Minister of State in Department of Urban Development.

The department's administration is headed by the Principal Secretary, who is an IAS officer, who is assisted by six Special Secretaries, two Joint Secretaries, and seven Deputy/Under Secretaries. The current Principal Secretary (UD) is Manoj Kumar Singh.

Secretariat level

Head of Department Level

References 

Urban Development
Uttar Pradesh
Urban development in India